Major Victor Joseph Harold Gunasekera, CCS (1921 — 1993) was a former Ceylonese civil servant. The former Controller of Imports Exports, Government Agent of Kegalle and Secretary to the Board of Control for Cricket. A reservist, he was a Major in the Ceylon Artillery and was one of the accused of the attempted military coup of 1962.

Educated at the Royal College, Colombo, where he played for the Royal–Thomian and at Ceylon University College. He joined the Ceylon Civil Service and went on to serve as Assistant Government Agent in Galle, Hambantota & Kandy and was the Assistant Secretary in the Ministry of External Affairs and Defence. He was instrumental in initiating the Maldive independence.

Thereafter he served as He was Government Agent, Kegalle before taking up the post of Controller of Imports Exports. Since the formation of the Ceylon Army he joined as a volunteer (reservist) in the 2nd Volunteer Coastal Artillery / Anti-Aircraft Regiment of the Ceylon Artillery. He was mobilized in 1958 due to the Galoya riots and was deployed to Jafna. In 1962, he was accused of taking part in the attempted military coup, arrested and tried. Later all convictions were over turned by the privy council.

References

Significance of the abortive 1962 military coup
THE QUEEN v.FREDERICK CECIL DE SARAM

1921 births
1993 deaths
Sri Lanka Artillery officers
Sinhalese civil servants
Sri Lankan Christians
Alumni of Royal College, Colombo
Prisoners and detainees of Sri Lanka
Sri Lankan prisoners and detainees
Alumni of the Ceylon University College
Government Agents (Sri Lanka)